Bird Wayne "Bert" Blue (December 9, 1877 – September 2, 1929) was an American professional baseball catcher. He played in Major League Baseball (MLB) for one season with St. Louis Browns and Philadelphia Athletics. For his career, he compiled a .286 batting average in 42 at-bats, with two runs batted in.

He was born in Bettsville, Ohio. He died at age 51 in Detroit, Michigan, where he is buried at Woodlawn Cemetery.

External links

References

1877 births
1929 deaths
St. Louis Browns players
Philadelphia Athletics players
Major League Baseball catchers
Baseball players from Ohio
Birmingham Barons players
Columbus Senators players
Richmond Rebels players
Burials in Michigan
People from Seneca County, Ohio
Piqua Picks players